Gewürztraminer is an aromatic wine grape variety, used in white wines, and performs best in cooler climates. In English, it is sometimes referred to colloquially as Gewürz (although this is never the case in German, because "Gewürz" means "herb" or "spice"), and in English and French it is written  (without the umlaut). Gewürztraminer is a variety with a pink to red skin colour, which makes it a "white wine grape" as opposed to the blue to black-skinned varieties commonly referred to as "red wine grapes". The variety has high natural sugar and the wines are white and usually off-dry, with a flamboyant bouquet of lychees. Indeed, Gewürztraminer and lychees share the same aroma compounds. Dry Gewürztraminers may also have aromas of roses, passion fruit and floral notes. It is not uncommon to notice some spritz (fine bubbles on the inside of the glass).

Gewürztraminer's sweetness may offset the spice in Southeast Asian cuisine.

Etymology
The German name Gewürztraminer literally means "Spice Traminer" or "Perfumed Traminer", and is attested in Germany from the 16th century. This grape variety is a mutation of the Savagnin blanc, also named Traminer in South Tyrol (region situated in northern Italy).

History

The history of the Traminer family is complicated, and not helped by its rather unstable genome. The story starts with the ancient Traminer variety, a green-skinned grape that takes its name from the village of Tramin, located in South Tyrol, the mainly German-speaking province in northern Italy. The famous ampelographer Pierre Galet thought that Traminer was identical to the green-skinned Savagnin blanc (not Sauvignon blanc) that makes vin jaune in the Jura. More recently it has been suggested that Savagnin blanc acquired slight differences in its leaf shape and geraniol content as it travelled to the other end of the Alps.

Frankisch in Austria, Gringet in Savoie, Heida in Switzerland, Formentin in Hungary and Grumin from Bohemia are all very similar to Savagnin blanc and probably represent clones of the Traminer family, if not Traminer itself. The Viognier of the Rhone Valley may be a more distant relative of Savagnin blanc.

At some point, either Traminer or Savagnin blanc mutated into a form with pink-skinned berries, called Red Traminer or Savagnin rose. Galet believed that a musqué ('muscat-like') mutation in the Red Traminer/Savagnin rose then led to the extra-aromatic Gewürztraminer, although in Germany these names are all regarded as synonymous.

With these convoluted genetics happening in the area that has been the front line for a millennium of wars in Europe, it is maybe not surprising that vines have been misnamed.  Given that the wine made from 'Gewürztraminer' in Germany can be much less aromatic than that in Alsace, some of the German vines may well be misidentified Savagnin Rose. The Baden vineyard of Durbach claims its own type of Red Traminer called Durbacher Clevner (not to be confused with "Klevner", an Austrian synonym for Pinot blanc). The story goes that in 1780 Karl Friedrich, Grand Duke of Baden brought vines from Chiavenna in Italy, halfway between Tramin and the Jura, which was known to the Germans as Cleven.

The Klevener de Heiligenstein or Heiligensteiner Klevener found around Heiligenstein in Alsace may represent an outpost of the Durbach vines.  They are often described as a less aromatic form of Gewürztraminer.

Traminer is recorded in Tramin from ca. 1000 until the 16th century. It was spread down the Rhine to Alsace, by way of the Palatinate, where Gewürz (spice) was added to its name – presumably this was when one of the mutations happened. The longer name was first used in Alsace (then under German rule) in the 1870's (. It is not clear what this name change represents, as it seems too great a coincidence that the musqué mutation happened just after the arrival of the great phylloxera epidemic. More likely, an existing mutant was selected for grafting onto phylloxera-resistant rootstocks when the vineyards were replanted. In 1973 the name Traminer was discontinued in Alsace except for in the Heiligenstein area.

Crosses 

The Germans have tried hard to breed the flavours of Gewürztraminer into vines that are easier to grow. In 1932, Georg Scheu crossed Gewürztraminer with Müller-Thurgau to produce Würzer, a little of which is grown in Rheinhessen and in England. Similar crosses at Alzey and Würzburg respectively have produced Septimer and the reasonably successful Perle. The early-ripening Siegerrebe is the result of a cross with Madeleine Angevine at Alzey and is notable for producing the highest ever must weight recorded in Germany, 326 °Oechsle. A cross between Müller-Thurgau and Siegerrebe produced Ortega.

Cserszegi fűszeres is the result of a Hungarian cross with Irsai Oliver.

In 1938, Harold Olmo crossed Sémillon and Gewürztraminer at U.C. Davis to make Flora, which is grown a little in California and New Zealand – in the latter it was mistaken for a late-ripening clone of Pinot gris. Brown Bros blend it with Orange Muscat in Australia.

In 1965, Gewürztraminer was crossed with Joannes Seyve 23.416 at the University of Illinois to produce a hybrid variety called Traminette. Traminette is more cold-tolerant than the original, while maintaining most of the desirable taste and aroma characteristics.

In the late 20th century, Australian viticulturalist and grape breeder A.J. Antcliff crossed Gewürztraminer with Merbein 29-56 to create the white grape variety Taminga.

During a series of trials between 1924 and 1930, Gewürztraminer was crossed with Trebbiano to create the pink-skinned Italian wine grape variety Manzoni rosa.

In 1970s, Czech winemaker and grape breeder Ing. Josef Veverka crossed in former Czechoslovakia Gewürztraminer with Müller-Thurgau to create the wine grape variety Pálava (the name refers to the Pálava hills located in the south Moravia). The grape variety is pink-skinned, earlier, more productive and of a finer traminer-like aroma. Pálava is grown in Moravia (Czech Republic) and Slovakia.

Regions

In Europe, the grape is grown in Austria, Bulgaria, Croatia, Czech Republic, France, Germany, Greece, Hungary, Italy, Luxembourg, North Macedonia, Romania, Serbia, Slovakia, Slovenia, Spain and in Turkey. In the New World, the grape is grown in Northern Michigan, though it is perhaps most successful in New Zealand, in Mendoza, the most important wine region of Argentina and in the far south of Chile. In the Middle East, the grape is grown in the Golan Heights.

Australia
Australian Gewürztraminer is more notable for its occasional use of old names like Traminer Musqué and Gentil Rose Aromatique than the actual quality of the wines. However recently those from the country's coolest regions can be fine examples. These include Gewürztraminers from the Adelaide Hills, Eden Valley, the island of Tasmania, Clare Valley, Yarra Valley and the vineyards scattered in the Australian Alps. The Macedon Ranges, just north of Melbourne, has a cold climate and volcanic soils, much suited to production of Gewürztraminer. (Macedon Ranges Vignerons Association.)

Canada
Canadian wine regions where it is grown include Vancouver Island and the Okanagan Valley of British Columbia, the Niagara Peninsula, and the north shore of Lake Erie and Prince Edward County wine regions of Ontario.

France
Gewürztraminer is planted in Alsace, where it is the second most planted grape variety and the one most characteristic of the region. It grows better in the south of the region. Styles of  range from the very dry Trimbach house style to the very sweet. The variety's high natural sugar means that it is popular for making dessert wine, both vendange tardive and the noble rot-affected Sélection de Grains Nobles.

As mentioned above, around Heiligenstein there is a grape known as Klevener de Heiligenstein, which is a Red Traminer (Savagnin Rose) and not a true Gewürz; the Heiligenstein wines are certainly more restrained than other Gewurztraminers d'Alsace.

Germany
Germany has about 10 square kilometres of the variety, but it is very different from that of their neighbours across the Rhine. As suggested above much of their "Gewürztraminer" is probably Red Traminer.  The Germans go for a relatively dry style, that tries to subdue the natural flamboyance of the grape.

Italy
The Traminer is native to the cool Alpine slopes of the Trentino-Alto Adige/Südtirol in northeastern Italy. Whether the Gewürz- mutant originated there or not is an open question, but it is certainly grown there today. What is certain is that the name "Traminer" derives from the town of Tramin. Confusingly, both pink and green grapes may be called simply Traminer.

Luxembourg
Luxembourg has also been prominent in the production of wines with Gewürztraminer grapes.

New Zealand 
Even though the volumes produced remain tiny, Gewürztraminer is more and more popular in New Zealand.  Around 200 hectares are being grown today, including 70ha in Marlborough, 54ha in Hawke's Bay, 19ha in Gisborne, 18ha in North Canterbury and 10ha in Central Otago.

United States
In the United States, Gewürztraminer grapes are concentrated in Monterey, Mendocino and Sonoma in California, the Columbia Valley of Washington and Oregon, and the Snake River Region of Idaho. It is also grown in Michigan, Rhode Island, Caddo County, Oklahoma, Ohio, Pennsylvania, Kentucky, Indiana, Hawaii, Texas, Virginia, Maryland, Missouri, New Mexico, New Hampshire, Grand Valley, Colorado and the Finger Lakes and Long Island Regions of New York.

Vine and viticulture
Gewürztraminer is particularly fussy about soil and climate. The vine is vigorous, even unruly, but it hates chalky soils and is very susceptible to disease. It buds early, so is very susceptible to frost, needs dry and warm summers, and ripens erratically and late. Its natural sweetness means that in hot climates it becomes blowsy, with not enough acidity to balance the huge amounts of sugar. On the other hand, picking early to retain the acidity, means that the varietal aromas do not develop, and these aromas may be further diluted by overcropping in an attempt to overcome the low yields.

Synonyms 
Genetic instability means that the Traminers should be regarded as a family of related clones, rather than distinct varieties. Thus DNA analysis will probably reveal that the following names are not synonymous. It gets even worse when it comes to Gewürztraminer, as Geilweilerhof, being Germans, see no difference between it and Red Traminer – and some of the names look like they belong to the original green-skinned Traminer/Savagnin blanc. Still, with those caveats, here they are:

Auvernas rouge, Blanc brun, Blanc Court, Bon blanc, Christkindeltraube, Christkindlestraube, Clevener, Clevner, Crevena Ruziva, Crovena Ruzica, Dišeči Traminec, Dreimaenner, Dreimannen, Dreipfennigholz, Drumin, Drumin Ljbora, Duret rouge, Edeltraube, Fermentin rouge, Fleischroth, Fleischweiner, Formentin rouge, Fourmenteau rouge, Frencher, Fromente, Fromenteau, Fűszeres, Fűszeres Tramini, Gentil Rose Aromatique, Gentil-duret rouge, Gentile blanc, Gertie, Gewuerztraminer, Gringet, Gris rouge, Haiden, Kirmizi Traminer, Klaebinger, Klaevner, Kleinbraun, Kleinwiener, Livora, Livora Cervena, Mala Dinka, Marzimmer, Mirisavi Traminac, Nature, Nature rose, Noble rose, Nuernberger Rot, Pinat Cervena, Piros Tramini, Plant Paien, Princ Cerveny, Princt Cervena, Princt Cerveny, Ranfoliza, Rosentraminer, Rotclevner, Rotedel, Roter Nuerberger, Roter Nuernberger, Roter Traminer, Rotfranken, Rothklauser, Rothweiner, Rothwiener, Rotklaevler, Rotklaevner, Rotklevner, Rousselet, Runziva, Rusa, Ruska, Ryvola, Salvagnin, Sauvagnin, Savagnin, Savagnin jaune, Savagnin Rosa Aromatique, Savagnin rose, Savagnin Rose Aromatique, Savagnin Rose Musque, St. Klauser, Termeno Aromatico, Tramín červený (Czech, Slovak), Tramin Korenny, Traminac, Traminac Crveni, Traminac Dišeći, Traminac mirisavi (Croatian), Traminac Mirisavi Crveni, Traminac Sivi, Traminec, Traminer, Traminer Aromatico, Traminer Epice, Traminer Musque, Traminer Parfume, Traminer rosa, Traminer Rose Aromatique, Traminer Rot, Traminer Rozovyi, Tramini Piros and Trammener.

See also
International variety

References

White wine grape varieties
Alsace wine
Wines of South Tyrol